Podocytes are cells in Bowman's capsule in the kidneys that wrap around capillaries of the glomerulus. Podocytes make  up the epithelial lining of Bowman's capsule, the third layer through which filtration of blood takes place. Bowman's capsule filters the blood, retaining large molecules such as proteins while smaller molecules such as water, salts, and sugars are filtered as the first step in the formation of urine. Although various viscera have epithelial layers, the name visceral epithelial cells usually refers specifically to podocytes, which are specialized epithelial cells that reside in the visceral layer of the capsule. One type of specialized epithelial cell is podocalyxin. 

 The podocytes have long foot processes called pedicels, for which the cells are named (podo- + -cyte). The pedicels wrap around the capillaries and leave slits between them. Blood is filtered through these slits, each known as a filtration slit, slit diaphragm, or slit pore. Several proteins are required for the pedicels to wrap around the capillaries and function. When infants are born with certain defects in these proteins, such as nephrin and CD2AP, their kidneys cannot function. People have variations in these proteins, and some variations may predispose them to kidney failure later in life. Nephrin is a zipper-like protein that forms the slit diaphragm, with spaces between the teeth of the zipper big enough to allow sugar and water through but too small to allow proteins through. Nephrin defects are responsible for congenital kidney failure. CD2AP regulates the podocyte cytoskeleton and stabilizes the slit diaphragm.

Structure

Podocytes are found lining the Bowman's capsules in the nephrons of the kidney. The foot processes  known as pedicels that extend from the podocytes wrap themselves around the capillaries of the glomerulus to form the filtration slits. The pedicels increase the surface area of the cells enabling efficient ultrafiltration.

Podocytes secrete and maintain the basement membrane.

There are numerous coated vesicles and coated pits along the basolateral domain of the podocytes which indicate a high rate of vesicular traffic.

Podocytes possess a well-developed endoplasmic reticulum and a large Golgi apparatus, indicative of a high capacity for protein synthesis and post-translational modifications.

There is also growing evidence of a large number of multivesicular bodies and other lysosomal components seen in these cells, indicating a high endocytic activity.

Function

Podocytes have primary processes called trabeculae, which wrap around the glomerular capillaries. The trabeculae in turn have secondary processes called pedicels. Pedicels interdigitate, thereby giving rise to thin gaps called filtration slits. The slits are covered by slit diaphragms which are composed of a number of cell-surface proteins including nephrin, podocalyxin, and P-cadherin, which restrict the passage of large macromolecules such as serum albumin and gamma globulin and ensure that they remain in the bloodstream. Proteins that are required for the correct function of the slit diaphragm include nephrin, NEPH1, NEPH2, podocin, CD2AP. and FAT1.

Small molecules such as water, glucose, and ionic salts are able to pass through the filtration slits and form an ultrafiltrate in the tubular fluid, which is further processed by the nephron to produce urine.

Podocytes are also involved in regulation of glomerular filtration rate (GFR). When podocytes contract, they cause closure of filtration slits. This decreases the GFR by reducing the surface area available for filtration.

Clinical significance

A loss of the foot processes of the podocytes (i.e., podocyte effacement) is a hallmark of minimal change disease, which has therefore sometimes been called foot process disease.

Disruption of the filtration slits or destruction of the podocytes can lead to massive proteinuria, where large amounts of protein are lost from the blood.

An example of this occurs in the congenital disorder Finnish-type nephrosis, which is characterised by neonatal proteinuria leading to end-stage kidney failure. This disease has been found to be caused by a mutation in the nephrin gene.

Presence of podocytes in urine has been proposed as an early diagnostic marker for preeclampsia.

See also 
List of human cell types derived from the germ layers

References

External links
  - "Mammal, renal vasculature (EM, High)
  - ". Ultrastructure of the Cell: podocytes and glomerular capillaries"
 
 podocyte.ca at Samuel Lunenfeld Research Institute
 
 
 

Kidney anatomy
Human cells
Epithelial cells